Connecticut's 32nd House of Representatives district elects one member of the Connecticut House of Representatives. It consists of the towns of Cromwell and Portland. It has been represented by Republican Christie Carpino since 2011.

Recent elections

2020

2018

2016

2014

2012

References

32